Boonsong Lekagul (15 December 1907 – 9 February 1992) was a Thai medical doctor, biologist, ornithologist, herpetologist, and conservationist.

He was born at Songkhla in southern Thailand and received a medical degree from Chulalongkorn University in Bangkok in 1933.  In 1935 he established Thailand's first polyclinic in Bangkok.  At first a keen hunter, he became a strong conservationist as he saw Thailand's forests and wildlife becoming fragmented and destroyed.  In 1952 he founded the Association for the Conservation of Wildlife.  In the mid-1950s, he and the ACW lobbied for a bird sanctuary on the banks of the Chao Phraya River to protect the only known nesting site in Thailand of the openbill stork.  In 1962 he founded the Bangkok Bird Club (the Bird Conservation Society of Thailand since 1993) and worked actively with the International Council for Bird Preservation and the World Wildlife Fund.

Eponymous species
Several species and subspecies are named after Boonsong Lekagul in honour of his work as naturalist and conservationist:
Boonsong's roundleaf bat, Hipposideros lekaguli 
Boonsong's variable squirrel, Callosciurus finlaysonii boonsongi 
Hill blue flycatcher, Cyornis whitei lekhakuni
Grey-eyed bulbul, Iole propinqua lekhakuni
Boonsong's stream snake, Opisthotropis boonsongi  – a snake endemic to Thailand, in the family Colubridae
Tuk-kai Boonsong, Cyrtodactylus lekaguli  – a species of bent-toed gecko endemic to Thailand
Lekagul's horned frog, Xenophrys (Megophrys) lekaguli  – a megophryid frog from Eastern Thailand.

Awards
Honorary member of the World Wide Fund for Nature, 1971
Commander (Third Class) of the Most Exalted Order of the White Elephant, 1974
Corresponding Fellow of the American Ornithologists Union, 1974
Honorary doctorate in Forestry, Kasetsart University, 1976
Honorary member of the International Union for the Conservation of Nature and Natural Resources, 1978
J. Paul Getty Wildlife Conservation Prize from the World Wildlife Fund US, 1979
Honorary doctorate in sciences, Chulalongkorn University, 1979
Order of the Golden Ark from Prince Bernard of the Netherlands, 1980
Knight Commander (Second Class) of the Most Noble Order of the Crown of Thailand, 1985

Publications
Works authored or coauthored by him include:
Lekagul, Boonsong (1968). Bird Guide of Thailand. (Illustrated by the author).
Lekagul, Boonsong (1969). Monitors (Varanus) of Thailand. Conservation News of S.E. Asia 8: 31–32.
Lekagul, Boonsong; Cronin, Paul (1974). Bird Guide of Thailand. (2nd edition). (Illustrated by the senior author). Bangkok: Association for the Conservation of Wildlife.
Lekagul, Boonsong; Askins, Karen; Nabhitabhata, Jarujinta; Samruadit, Aroon (1977). Fieldguide to the Butterflies of Thailand. Bangkok: Association for the Conservation of Wildlife.
Lekagul, Boonsong; McNeely, Jeffrey A. (1977). Mammals of Thailand.
Lekagul, Boonsong; Round, Philip D. (1991). A Guide to the Birds of Thailand. (Illustrated by Mongkol Wongkalasin and Kamol Komolphalin). Thailand: Saha Karn Bhaet Co.

References

Further reading
McClure, H. Elliott (1993). "In Memoriam: Boonsong Lekagul, 1907-1992". Auk 110 (1): 128.

External links
Bird Conservation Society of Thailand
Official Dr Boonsong Lekagul Website

Lekagul, Boonsong
Lekagul, Boonsong
Lekagul, Boonsong
Boonsong Lekagul
Boonsong Lekagul
Boonsong Lekagul
Lekagul, Boonsong